Helen Carr is a journalist and emeritus professor of English and comparative literature at Goldsmiths, University of London. Her book on the imagist movement was described by Ian Sansom in The Guardian as "the most comprehensive book on the subject ever written."

Selected publications
Inventing the American Primitive: Politics, Gender and the Representation of Native American Literary Traditions, 1789–1936 (1996)
The Verse Revolutionaries: Ezra Pound, H.D. and The Imagists (2009)
Jean Rhys (2011)
The Red Prince: The Life of John of Gaunt, the Duke of Lancaster (Oneworld Publications) (2021)

References

External links
'Intemperate and Unchaste': Jean Rhys and Caribbean Creole Identity

Living people
Year of birth missing (living people)
Academics of Goldsmiths, University of London
British academics of English literature
British women journalists
British women academics